Mengozzi is an Italian surname. Notable people with the surname include:

Fabio Mengozzi (born 1980), Italian composer and pianist
Stefano Mengozzi (born 1985), Italian volleyball player
Gerolamo Mengozzi Colonna (1688–1744), Italian painter

See also
Mingozzi

Italian-language surnames